Grand Island is an unincorporated community in Lake County, Florida, United States.

References

Unincorporated communities in Lake County, Florida
Unincorporated communities in Florida